Saxe-Meiningen was one of the Saxon duchies held by the Ernestine line of the Wettin dynasty, located in the southwest of the present-day German state of Thuringia.

Established in 1681, by partition of the Ernestine duchy of Saxe-Gotha among the seven sons of deceased Duke Ernst der Fromme (Ernest the Pious), the Saxe-Meiningen line of the House of Wettin lasted until the end of the German monarchies in 1918.

History

House of Wettin
The Wettiner had been the rulers of sizeable holdings in today's states of Saxony, Saxony-Anhalt and Thuringia since the Middle Ages. In the Leipziger Teilung of 1485, the Wettiner were split into two branches named after their founding princes Albrecht and Ernst (albertinisch and ernestinisch). Thuringia was part of the Ernestine holdings of Kursachsen (the Electoral holdings of Saxony). In 1572, the branches Saxe-Coburg-Eisenach and Saxe-Weimar were established there. The senior line again split in 1641/41 into three duchies, including the Duchy of Saxe-Gotha.

Duke Ernst I who founded this duchy with its seat at Gotha opposed the system of primogeniture. As a result, on his death in 1675 all of his sons inherited part of his holdings and were supposed to rule under the leadership of his oldest son. In practice, this proved very complicated and brought on three settlements in 1679, 1680 and 1681 that established the following princedoms: Saxe-Gotha (Friedrich), Saxe-Coburg (Albrecht), Saxe-Meiningen (Bernhard), Saxe-Eisenberg (Christian), Saxe-Hildburghausen (Ernst) and Saxe-Saalfeld (Johann Ernst).

Duchy of Saxe-Meiningen
Bernhard, Ernst I third son, received the town of Meiningen as well as several other holdings (Wasungen und Salzungen, Maßfeld und Sand, Herrenbreitungen, Herpf, Stepfershausen, Utendorf, Mehlis and the former Franconian lands of the extinct House of Henneberg, Henneberg).

Bernhard chose the town of Meiningen as his residence and became the first Duke of Saxe-Meiningen. From 1682 Duke Bernhard I had the Schloss Elisabethenburg built and in 1690 established a court orchestra (Hofkapelle), in which Johann Ludwig Bach later became the Kapellmeister (1711).

In the reshuffle of Ernestine territories that occurred following the extinction of the Saxe-Gotha-Altenburg line upon the death of Duke Friedrich IV in 1825, Duke Bernhard II of Saxe-Meiningen received the lands of the former Duchy of Saxe-Hildburghausen as well as the Saalfeld territory of the former Saxe-Coburg-Saalfeld duchy.

As Bernhard II had supported Austria in the 1866 Austro-Prussian War, the prime minister of victorious Prussia, Otto von Bismarck, enforced his resignation in favour of his son Georg II, after which Saxe-Meiningen was admitted to join the North German Confederation.

The ducal summer residence was at Altenstein Castle. Since 1868, the duchy comprised the Kreise (districts) of Hildburghausen, Sonneberg and Saalfeld as well as the northern exclaves of Camburg and Kranichfeld.

End of the Duchy
In the German Revolution after World War I, Duke Bernhard III, brother-in-law of Emperor Wilhelm II, was forced to abdicate and his brother Ernst on 11/12 November 1918 refused the succession. The succeeding "Free State of Saxe-Meiningen" was merged into the new state of Thuringia on 1 May 1920.

Dukes of Saxe-Meiningen 

 Bernhard I (1680–1706)
 Ernst Ludwig I (1706–24), son of Bernhard I
 Ernst Ludwig II (1724–29), son of Ernst Ludwig I
 Karl Friedrich (1729–43), son of Ernst Ludwig I
 Friedrich Wilhelm (1743–46), son of Bernhard I
 Anton Ulrich (1746–63), son of Bernhard I
 Karl Wilhelm (1763–82), son of Anton Ulrich
 Georg I (1782–1803), son of Anton Ulrich, father of Queen Adelaide 
 Bernhard II (1803–66), son of Georg I
 Georg II (1866–1914), son of Bernhard II
 Bernhard III (1914–18), son of Georg II

Notes: 
 Friedrich Wilhelm and Friedrich II of Saxe-Gotha reigned as guardians for the minor Karl Friedrich in 1729-1733
 Friedrich Wilhelm and Anton Ulrich reigned jointly in 1743-46
 Charlotte Amalie reigned as regent/guardian for the minors Karl Wilhelm und Georg I in 1763-82
 Luise Eleonore reigned as regent/guardian for the minor Bernhard II in 1803-1821
 Dukedom abolished in 1918.

Heads of the Ducal House of Saxe-Meiningen, post-monarchy 

Bernhard III (1918–1928)
Prince Ernst (1928–1941)
Prince Georg III (1941–1946)
Prince Bernhard IV (1946–1984)
Prince Konrad (1984–present)

See also
 Ernestine duchies

References

External links 

States and territories disestablished in 1918
States of the Confederation of the Rhine
States of the German Confederation
States of the North German Confederation
States of the German Empire
States of the Weimar Republic
Meiningen
 
 
House of Wettin
South Thuringia
1680 establishments in the Holy Roman Empire
1918 disestablishments in Germany